Dieter Purschel (7 February 1941 – 25 February 2023) was a German ice hockey goaltender, who competed for SC Dynamo Berlin. He played for the East Germany national ice hockey team at the 1968 Winter Olympics in Grenoble.

References

1941 births
2023 deaths
German ice hockey goaltenders
Ice hockey players at the 1968 Winter Olympics
Olympic ice hockey players of East Germany
People from Weißwasser
SC Dynamo Berlin (ice hockey) players
Sportspeople from Saxony